The Guitreau House, also known as Belle Place, is a historic house located at 16825 LA 16 in French Settlement, Louisiana.

Built in c.1911 for Armond LaBougeois, the house is a one-story frame cottage in French Creole style. The building was widely renovated and expanded in after its 1914 sale to A.D. Guitreau. In the 1960s the house was purchased by Cajun chef and humorist Justin Wilson which sold it to Edward and Tana Berteau in 1979.

The house was listed on the National Register of Historic Places on May 14, 1992.

See also
 National Register of Historic Places listings in Livingston Parish, Louisiana

References

Houses on the National Register of Historic Places in Louisiana
Creole architecture in Louisiana
Houses completed in 1911
Livingston Parish, Louisiana
National Register of Historic Places in Livingston Parish, Louisiana